USS Rappahannock may refer to the following ships of the United States Navy:

 , was a stores ship and animal transport in commission from 1917 to 1924
 , was renamed Kern during construction in 1942
 , is a fleet replenishment oiler in Military Sealift Command service since 1995

United States Navy ship names